Oru Maymasa Pulariyil is a 1987 Indian Malayalam-language film co-written and directed by V. R. Gopinath, starring Balachandra Menon, Murali and Shari. It was the debut of Ranjith, who wrote the story of the film.

Plot
Balachandra Menon's character comes to investigate the reasons for the apparent suicide of Shari's character. Shari's character is the central theme of the plot for the film.

Cast
 Balachandra Menon
 Murali
 Shari
 Ashokan as Cricket Star  
 Parvathy as Mook Bharatham 
 Kaviyoor Ponnamma
 Nedumudi Venu
 Sreeja
 Dheeraj as Peracholly

Soundtrack
The music was composed by Raveendran with lyrics by P. Bhaskaran.

References

External links
 
 Oru Maymasa Pulariyil at Cinemaofmalayalam.net

1980s Malayalam-language films
Films with screenplays by Ranjith